Walter Koenig (born 2 February 1958) is an Australian wrestler. He competed in the men's freestyle 90 kg at the 1988 Summer Olympics.

References

External links
 

1958 births
Living people
Australian male sport wrestlers
Olympic wrestlers of Australia
Wrestlers at the 1988 Summer Olympics
Place of birth missing (living people)
Commonwealth Games medallists in wrestling
Commonwealth Games silver medallists for Australia
Wrestlers at the 1974 British Commonwealth Games
Wrestlers at the 1978 Commonwealth Games
Wrestlers at the 1982 Commonwealth Games
Wrestlers at the 1986 Commonwealth Games
20th-century Australian people
21st-century Australian people
Medallists at the 1974 British Commonwealth Games
Medallists at the 1978 Commonwealth Games
Medallists at the 1982 Commonwealth Games
Medallists at the 1986 Commonwealth Games